Pickens County may refer to:
Pickens County, Alabama
Pickens County, Georgia
Pickens County, South Carolina

See also
 Pickens County Airport (disambiguation)